Mikuláš Teich (24 July 1918 – 16 August 2018) was a Slovak-British historian of science, best known for the series of histories in national context which he co-edited with Roy Porter. He was married to the economic historian Alice Teichova.

Life
Mikuláš Teich was born in Kassa (Košice) on 24 July 1918, and grew up in an assimilated Jewish family. He studied medicine at Masaryk University, where he became politically active. After the German invasion in March 1939, he and his older brother decided to emigrate, and arrived in London in April 1939. Helped by the Montefiore family, he studied for an external university degree in chemistry at University College, Exeter. He went on to study at Leeds University, joining the Communist Party alongside Alice, who became his wife in 1944. After he gained his doctorate in 1946, they returned to Prague. However, Teich was there labelled a “destructive element” and lost his job in the chemistry department. He managed to build another career in the history of science, and was reinstated as a Party member in 1963. After the repression of the Prague Spring, he and Alice managed to escape to West Germany and on to England. There Joseph Needham found him employment at Caius College until he became a founding fellow of Robinson College, Cambridge. He remained a Fellow of Robinson until the end of his life, on 16 August 2018.

Works

Books
 (ed. with Robert Young) Changing perspectives in the history of science: essays in honour of Joseph Needham, 1973
 (with Alica Teichova) Two essays on central European economic history, 1981
 (ed. with Roy Porter) The Enlightenment in national context, 1981
 (ed. with Roy Porter) Revolution in history, 1986
 (ed. with Roy Porter) Romanticism in national context, 1988
 (ed. with Roy Porter) Fin de siècle and its legacy, 1990
 (ed. with Roy Porter) The Renaissance in national context, 1991
 (ed, with Roy Porter) The scientific revolution in national context, 1992
 (ed. with Roy Porter) The National question in Europe in historical context, 1992
 (ed. with Dorothy M. Needham) A documentary history of biochemistry, 1770-1940, 1992
 (ed. with Roy Poter) The Reformation in national context, 1994
 (ed with Roy Porter) Sexual knowledge, sexual science : the history of attitudes to sexuality, 1994
 (ed. with Roy Porter) Drugs and narcotics in history, 1995
 (ed. with Roy Porter) The industrial revolution in national context, 1996
 (ed. with Roy Porter and Bo Gustaffson)Nature and society in national context, 1997
 (ed.) Bohemia in history, 1998
 (with Alice Teichová) Zwischen der kleinen und der grossen Welt : ein gemeinsames Leben im 20. Jahrhundert [Between the small and the large world: a common life in the 20th century], 2005
 (ed. with Dušan Kováč and Martin D Brown) Slovakia in History, 2011
 The Scientific Revolution Revisited, 2015

Articles
 'Haldane and Lysenko revisited', Journal of the History of Biology Revisited, Vol. 40, No. 3 (Sep. 2007), pp.557-63

References

1918 births
2018 deaths
Czechoslovak emigrants to the United Kingdom
Fellows of Robinson College, Cambridge
Writers from Košice
Slovak centenarians
British centenarians
Men centenarians